Pseudoxenodon inornatus, commonly known as the dull bamboo snake, is a species of snake in the family Colubridae. 

The species is endemic to Indonesia.

The snake lives in bamboo and wet montane forests.

Subspecies
 Pseudoxenodon inornatus inornatus 
 Pseudoxenodon inornatus buettikoferi 
 Pseudoxenodon inornatus jacobsonii

References

Pseudoxenodon
Reptiles described in 1827
Reptiles of Indonesia
Endemic fauna of Indonesia
Taxa named by Friedrich Boie